The 2013 gubernatorial elections for Murang'a County, Kenya, were held on 4 March 2013. Under the new constitution, which was passed in a 2010 referendum, the 2013 general elections were the first in which Governors and members of the County Assemblies for the newly created counties were elected.  They will also be the first general elections run by the Independent Electoral and Boundaries Commission(IEBC) which has released the official list of candidates.

Gubernatorial election

Prospective candidates
The following are some of the candidates who had made public their intentions to run:
 Joshua Toro - former Roads assistant minister 
 Francis Mwangi - former New KCC managing director 
 Julius Kaberere - Commonwealth Technocrat  
 Moses Mwangi - Murang’a County Initiative chairman  
 Peter Karanja - an Anglican priest (He however dropped out of the race citing intimidation and threats to his life.)

References

 

2013 local elections in Kenya